Scheduled offence may refer to:
An offence listed in a schedule to a statute indicating that the statute's provisions apply to such offences:
 Anti-Terrorism (Amendment) Ordinance, 1999, Pakistan—scheduled offences are considered terrorist acts
 Arms Offences Act, Singapore—scheduled offences are liable to the death penalty
 Firearms (Increased Penalties) Act 1971, Malaysia—scheduled offences are liable to the death penalty
 Prevention of Money Laundering Act, 2002, India—dealing with the proceeds of crime of scheduled offences
 Terrorism Act 2000, United Kingdom—scheduled offences may have juryless trials
In particular, an offence which is tried in a special court instead of the ordinary criminal courts:
Diplock court—Northern Ireland, 1973–2007
 Special Criminal Court—Republic of Ireland 1939–1946, 1961–62, and since 1972

See also
 Criminal procedure in South Africa, offences on different schedules are processed differently